Sami "Tundra" Uusitalo (born 1977) is a bass guitarist best known from the folk metal band Finntroll and the funeral doom band Shape of Despair. He also plays in the folk/doom metal group The Mist and the Morning Dew. Despite sharing the same name with a member of Funebre, he is not the same person.

References 

Finntroll members
1977 births
Finnish heavy metal bass guitarists
Living people
21st-century bass guitarists